Grevillea imberbis is a species of flowering plant in the family Proteaceae and is endemic to eastern New South Wales. It is a prostrate to low, spreading shrub with egg-shaped to lance-shaped leaves with the narrower end towards the base, and white flowers, sometimes turning pink with age.

Description
Flowering occurs from August to February.

Taxonomy
Grevillea imberbis was first formally described in 2000 by Robert Owen Makinson in the Flora of Australia from specimens collected by Roger Coveny near Kanangra Walls in 1973. The specific epithet (imberbis) means "beardless", referring to the lack of a beard on the inner perianth.

Distribution and habitat
This grevillea is only known from the Kanangra Walls area and in the area between Braidwood and Mongarlowe where it grows in heath and on the edges of heathy woodland.

References

imberbis
Proteales of Australia
Flora of New South Wales
Taxa named by Robert Owen Makinson
Plants described in 2000